Brigadier General Robert Scott-Kerr   (2 November 1859 – 25 November 1942) was a British Army officer.

After being educated at Eton and Trinity College, Cambridge, he was commissioned in the 24th Regiment of Foot in 1879, transferring shortly thereafter to the Grenadier Guards. He saw service in the Zulu War in 1879, where he fought at the Battle of Ulundi. Promotion to lieutenant followed on 1 July 1881, and in 1885 he fought in the Mahdist War. He was promoted to captain on 16 December 1890, and to major on 19 September 1896. Following the outbreak of the Second Boer War in 1899, Scott-Kerr served with his regiment in South Africa. He took part in the operations in the Orange Free State April to May 1900, and in the Orange River Colony May to November 1900, including the actions at Biddulphsberg (May 1900) and Wittebergen (July 1900), where he was mentioned in despatches and for which he was awarded the Distinguished Service Order (DSO). After peace was declared in May 1902, he left South Africa on board the SS Bavarian and arrived in the United Kingdom the following month.

On his return from South Africa, he was in July 1902 appointed second in command of the 2nd Battalion Grenadier Guards, and from 1904 to 1908 he commanded the 1st Battalion Grenadier Guards. He was made a Member of the Royal Victorian Order in 1908 and a Companion of the Order of the Bath in the 1914 Birthday Honours.

On the outbreak of the First World War he took command of 4th (Guards) Brigade in the British Expeditionary Force. He was wounded on 1 September, commanding 4th Brigade in a rearguard action during the Retreat from Mons, and returned to England. The injuries proved so severe that he never again held a field command; he commanded a brigade in the Home Forces for the remainder of the war, before retiring in 1919.

He was appointed a Companion of the Order of St Michael and St George in the 1919 New Year Honours.

References 

Obituary in The Times, 26 November 1942.
SCOTT-KERR, Brig.-Gen. Robert. (2008). In Who Was Who 1897-2007.
Robert Scott-Kerr, by John Bourne. Centre for First World War Studies.

People educated at Eton College
Alumni of Trinity College, Cambridge
Grenadier Guards officers
British Army personnel of the Anglo-Zulu War
British Army personnel of the Mahdist War
British Army personnel of the Second Boer War
British Army generals of World War I
Companions of the Distinguished Service Order
1859 births
1942 deaths
South Wales Borderers officers
Members of the Royal Victorian Order
Companions of the Order of the Bath
Companions of the Order of St Michael and St George